"My Medicine" is a song by American rapper Snoop Dogg, released on June 14, 2008, as the fourth single from his ninth studio album Ego Trippin'. The song features American country musicians Willie Nelson and Everlast, the latter of whom produced the song.

Music video 
The music video was directed by Pook Brown.

Track listing 
CD Single
My Medicine (featuring Willie Nelson and Everlast)  — 2:40

Chart performance

Weekly charts

References

2008 singles
Snoop Dogg songs
Everlast (musician) songs
Willie Nelson songs
Songs written by Snoop Dogg
2008 songs
Geffen Records singles
Country rap songs
Songs about cannabis